The 1985 Goya Matchroom Trophy was a professional ranking snooker tournament that took place between 23 September to 6 October 1985 at Trentham Gardens in Stoke-on-Trent, England.

Cliff Thorburn won the tournament defeating Jimmy White 12–10 in the final having trailed 0–7. The defending champion Steve Davis was defeated by White in the quarter-finals.


Main draw

References

Scottish Open (snooker)
International Open
International Open
International Open
International Open
Sport in Stoke-on-Trent